Ben Okri  (born 15 March 1959) is a Nigerian-British poet and novelist. Okri is considered one of the foremost African authors in the post-modern and post-colonial traditions, and has been compared favourably to authors such as Salman Rushdie and Gabriel García Márquez. In 1991, Okri won the Booker Prize with his novel The Famished Road.

Biography
Ben Okri is a member of the Urhobo people; his father was Urhobo, and his mother was half-Igbo ("from a royal family"). He was born in Minna in west central Nigeria to Grace and Silver Okri in 1959. His father, Silver, moved his family to London when Okri was less than two years old so that he could study law. Okri thus spent his earliest years in London and attended primary school in Peckham. In 1966, Silver moved his family back to Nigeria, where he practised law in Lagos, providing free or discounted services for those who could not afford it. After attending schools in Ibadan and Ikenne, Okri began his secondary education at Urhobo College at Warri, in 1968, when he was the youngest in his class. His exposure to the Nigerian civil war and a culture in which his peers at the time claimed to have seen visions of spirits, later provided inspiration for Okri's fiction.

At the age of 14, after being rejected for admission to a short university program in physics because of his youth and lack of qualifications, Okri experienced a revelation that poetry was his chosen calling. He began writing articles on social and political issues, but these never found a publisher. He then wrote short stories based on those articles, and some were published in women's journals and evening papers. Okri claimed that his criticism of the government in some of this early work led to his name being placed on a death list, and necessitated his departure from the country. In 1978, Okri moved back to England and went to study comparative literature at Essex University with a grant from the Nigerian government. When funding for his scholarship fell through, however, Okri found himself homeless, sometimes living in parks and sometimes with friends. He describes this period as "very, very important" to his work: "I wrote and wrote in that period... If anything [the desire to write] actually intensified."

Okri's success as a writer began when he published his debut novel Flowers and Shadows in 1980, at the age of 21. From 1983 to 1986, he served as poetry editor of West Africa magazine, and was also a regular contributor to the BBC World Service between 1983 and 1985, continuing to publish throughout this period.

His reputation as an author was secured when his novel The Famished Road won the Booker Prize for Fiction in 1991, making him the youngest ever winner of the prize at the age of 32. The novel was written during the three years from 1988 that Okri lived in a Notting Hill flat rented from publisher friend Margaret Busby, and he has said: "Something about my writing changed round about that time. I acquired a kind of tranquillity. I had been striving for something in my tone of voice as a writer — it was there that it finally came together.... That flat is also where I wrote the short stories that became Stars of the New Curfew."

Literary career

Since the publication in 1980 of his first novel, Flowers and Shadows, Okri has risen to an international acclaim, and he often is described as one of Africa's leading writers. His best known work, The Famished Road, which was awarded the 1991 Booker Prize, along with Songs of Enchantment (1993) and Infinite Riches (1998) make up a trilogy that follows the life of Azaro, a spirit-child narrator, through the social and political turmoil of an African nation reminiscent of Okri's remembrance of war-torn Nigeria.

Okri's work is particularly difficult to categorise. Although it has been widely categorised as post-modern, some scholars have noted that the seeming realism with which he depicts the spirit-world challenges this categorisation. If Okri does attribute reality to a spiritual world, it is claimed, then his "allegiances are not postmodern [because] he still believes that there is something ahistorical or transcendental conferring legitimacy on some, and not other, truth-claims." Alternative characterisations of Okri's work suggest an allegiance to Yoruba folklore, New Ageism, spiritual realism, magical realism, visionary materialism, and existentialism.

Against these analyses, Okri has always rejected the categorisation of his work as magical realism, claiming that this categorisation is the result of laziness on the part of critics and likening this categorisation to the observation that "a horse ... has four legs and a tail. That doesn't describe it." He has instead described his fiction as obeying a kind of "dream logic," and stated that his fiction often is preoccupied with the "philosophical conundrum ... what is reality?" insisting that:

"I grew up in a tradition where there are simply more dimensions to reality: legends and myths and ancestors and spirits and death ... Which brings the question: what is reality? Everyone's reality is different. For different perceptions of reality we need a different language. We like to think that the world is rational and precise and exactly how we see it, but something erupts in our reality which makes us sense that there's more to the fabric of life. I'm fascinated by the mysterious element that runs through our lives. Everyone is looking out of the world through their emotion and history. Nobody has an absolute reality."

He notes the effect of personal choices, "Beware of the stories you read or tell; subtly, at night, beneath the waters of consciousness, they are altering your world."

Okri's short fiction has been described as more realistic and less fantastic than his novels, but these stories also depict Africans in communion with spirits, while his poetry and nonfiction have a more overt political tone, focusing on the potential of Africa and the world to overcome the problems of modernity.

In the 2001 Queen's Birthday Honours he was appointed an OBE for services to Literature.

Okri was made an honorary vice-president of the English Centre for the International PEN and a member of the board of the Royal National Theatre. On 26 April 2012, Okri was appointed the new vice-president of the Caine Prize for African Writing, having been on the advisory committee and associated with the prize since it was established 13 years prior.

In April 2019, Okri gave the keynote address at the second Berlin African Book Festival, curated by Tsitsi Dangarembga.

Influences

Okri has described his work as influenced as much by the philosophical texts in his father's book shelves, as it was by literature, and Okri cites the influence of both Francis Bacon and Michel de Montaigne on his A Time for New Dreams. His literary influences include Aesop's Fables, Arabian Nights, Shakespeare's A Midsummer Night's Dream, and Coleridge's "The Rime of the Ancient Mariner". Okri's 1999 epic poem, Mental Fight, also is named after a quotation from the poet William Blake's "And did those feet ...", and critics have noted the close relationship between Blake and Okri's poetry.

Okri also was influenced by the oral tradition of his people, and particularly, his mother's storytelling: "If my mother wanted to make a point, she wouldn't correct me, she'd tell me a story." His first-hand experiences of civil war in Nigeria are said to have inspired many of his works.

On the final day of the 2021 COP26 climate meeting in Glasgow, Okri wrote about the existential threat posed by the climate crisis and how illequipped humans seem to be to confront the prospect of their own self-inflicted extinction.  Indeed, Okri says, "[w]e have to find a new art and a new psychology to penetrate the apathy and the denial that are preventing us making the changes that are inevitable if our world is to survive."

Awards and honours

 1987: Commonwealth Writers Prize (Africa Region, Best Book) – Incidents at the Shrine
 1987: Aga Khan Prize for Fiction – The Dream Vendor's August
 1988: Guardian Fiction Prize – Stars of the New Curfew (shortlisted)
 1991–1993: Fellow Commoner in Creative Arts (FCCA), Trinity College, Cambridge
 1991: Booker Prize – The Famished Road
 1993: Chianti Ruffino-Antico Fattore International Literary Prize – The Famished Road
 1994: Premio Grinzane Cavour (Italy) -The Famished Road
 1995: Crystal Award (World Economic Forum)
 1997: Honorary Doctorate of Literature, awarded by University of Westminster
 1999:  (Italy) – Dangerous Love
 2001: Order of the British Empire (OBE)
 2002: Honorary Doctorate of Literature, awarded by University of Essex
 2003: Chosen as one of 100 Great Black Britons
 2004: Honorary Doctor of Literature, awarded by University of Exeter
 2008: International Literary Award Novi Sad (International Novi Sad Literature Festival, Serbia)
 2009: Honorary Doctorate of Utopia, awarded by Universiteit voor het Algemeen Belang, Belgium
 2010: Honorary Doctorate, awarded by School of Oriental and African Studies
 2010: Honorary Doctorate of Arts, awarded by the University of Bedfordshire
 2014: Honorary Fellow, Mansfield College, Oxford
 2014: Bad Sex in Fiction Award, Literary Review

Works

Novels 
 Flowers and Shadows (Harlow: Longman, 1980)
 The Landscapes Within (Harlow: Longman, 1981)
 The Famished Road (London: Jonathan Cape, 1991)
 Songs of Enchantment (London: Jonathan Cape, 1993)
 Astonishing the Gods (London: Weidenfeld & Nicolson, 1995)
 Dangerous Love (London: Weidenfeld & Nicolson, 1996)
 Infinite Riches (London: Weidenfeld & Nicolson, 1998)
 In Arcadia (Weidenfeld & Nicolson, 2002)
 Starbook (London: Rider Books, 2007)
 The Age of Magic (London: Head of Zeus, 2014)
 The Freedom Artist (London: Head of Zeus, 2019)
 Every Leaf a Hallelujah (London: Head of Zeus, 2021)

Poetry, essays and short story collections 

 Incidents at the Shrine (short stories; London: Heinemann, 1986)
 Stars of the New Curfew (short stories; London: Secker & Warburg, 1988)
 An African Elegy (poetry; London: Jonathan Cape, 1992)
 Birds of Heaven (essays; London: Phoenix House, 1996)
 A Way of Being Free (essays; London: Weidenfeld & Nicolson: 1997; London: Phoenix House, 1997)
 Mental Fight (poetry: London: Weidenfeld & Nicolson, 1999; London: Phoenix House, 1999)
 Tales of Freedom (short stories; London: Rider & Co., 2009)
 A Time for New Dreams (essays; London: Rider & Co., 2011)
 Wild (poetry; London: Rider & Co., 2012)
The Mystery Feast: Thoughts on Storytelling (West Hoathly: Clairview Books, Ltd, 2015)
 The Magic Lamp: Dreams of Our Age, with paintings by Rosemary Clunie (Apollo/Head of Zeus, 2017)
 Rise Like Lions: Poetry for the many (as editor; London: Hodder & Stoughton, 2018)
 Prayer for the Living: Stories (London: Head of Zeus, 2019)
 A Fire in My Head: Poems for the Dawn (London: Head of Zeus, 2021)

Film 

 N – The Madness of Reason (feature film, directed by Peter Krüger, 2014)

Online fiction

References

Relevant literature
Irene, Michael Oshoke. 2015. Re-inventing oral tradition in Ben Okri's trilogy : The Famished Road, Songs of Enchantment and Infinite Riches. Anglia Ruskin University, doctoral dissertation.

External links
 Official website
 Ben Okri's AALBC.com Author Profile
 Ben Okri's official Facebook Page
 Ben Okri's MySpace page
 Ben Okri's official page on the Booker Prizes website.
 Full length You Tube video of Ben Okri winning the 1991 Booker Prize.
 The Ben Okri Bibliography – an extensive bibliography of works by and about Ben Okri. Also includes a short biography and an introduction to his work.
 Audio: Ben Okri in conversation on the BBC World Service discussion programme The Forum, 19 July 2009.
 Ben Okri on RSA Audio, 4 April 2011.
 "The Awakening Age", a poem by Ben Okri.
 "Draw", a poem by Ben Okri.
 "Lines in Potentis" , a poem by Ben Okri.
 "Children of the Dream", a poem by Ben Okri.
 "Dancing With Change", a poem by Ben Okri.
 "I sing a new freedom", a poem by Ben Okri.
 "As clouds pass above our heads...", a poem by Ben Okri.
 "O That Abstract Garden" , a poem by Ben Okri.
 Ben Okri: An extended film interview with transcripts for the Why Are We Here? documentary series.
 Réhab Abdelghany, "A Question of Power: Ben Okri's 'Meditations on Greatness' at Africa Writes", Africa in Words, 24 August 2015.

1959 births
Living people
20th-century male writers
20th-century Nigerian novelists
21st-century male writers
21st-century Nigerian novelists
Alumni of the University of Essex
Black British writers
Booker Prize winners
English people of Nigerian descent
Fellows of the Royal Society of Literature
Magic realism writers
Nigerian fantasy writers
Nigerian male novelists
Officers of the Order of the British Empire
People from Minna
Urhobo people
Weird fiction writers